UT Press can stand for:

the University of Tennessee Press
the University of Texas Press
University of Toronto Press